"Canned Heat" is the second single from British funk and acid jazz band Jamiroquai's fourth studio album, Synkronized (1999). Released on 24 May 1999, it was their second number-one single on the US Dance Club Songs chart and peaked at number four on the UK Singles Chart. The music video was directed by Jonas Åkerlund. The song is used in the film Napoleon Dynamite as the music of the title character's famous dance performance before a high-school assembly.

Release
Over the numerous releases of the "Canned Heat" single, two B-sides exist. "Wolf in Sheep's Clothing" is a funky instrumental that features an intro of two drum beats that lasts about 1.5 seconds and then enters a strongly bass-driven, repetitive melody (which is very reminiscent of "Stayin' Alive" by the Bee Gees). Many keyboard effects are used throughout the song's 4-minute duration. The song enters a percussion section at 3:07 and lasts for the remainder of the song, slowly fading out from 3:45. The song was originally released as part of the charity album No Boundaries: A Benefit for the Kosovar Refugees in 1998 before being included on this single. It is also available on some editions of the Synkronized album, the Australian double disc release being an example.

The Cillington mix of "Deeper Underground" is included on the second release of "Canned Heat". Chillington is not the name of an artist or DJ but instead the name of the studios at Jay's Home in Buckinghamshire. The Chillington Mix samples heavily from the Jamiroquai song "Getinfunky", which is found on some special releases of Synkronized, including the Japanese release, where it replaced "Deeper Underground" as the bonus track, and alongside "Wolf in Sheep's Clothing" on the Australian double disc. On the High Times: The Singles DVD, Jay comments on a bonus feature that the original Godzilla song was just made of "Ominous noises" which strongly matches the sound of "Getinfunky". When the song's "ominous noises" are pared away, it strongly suggests that "Getinfunky" is an early version of the Godzilla song which later evolved into "Deeper Underground".

Critical reception
Daily Record wrote, "Cat in the hatster, Jay Kay returns with another distinctive and clever funk tune". Sunday Mirror said, "Seventies funk, expensive video, silly hat. Well, it worked last time didn't it? And the time before that." Howard Cohen from The Miami Herald called it "a buzzed mirror-ball escapee from Studio 54".

Music video
A music video was made to accompany the song. It was directed by Swedish director Jonas Åkerlund. In the video, Jay Kay is in his London apartment awake on his bed, and he decides to get up and put his shoes on. Once he does, he then talks to one of his walls and then phases through the wall into a living room. He then does a bit of dancing around before leaping through another wall into a dining room as he dances on the table, messing up the setup as he swings on a chandelier through another wall into a room where a party is going on. He dances about and inexplicably starts floating around, defying gravity. He then floats off and emerges into a bathroom, continuing to dance, and then goes into a couple's room and continues to dance and mess around before going back to the party room and doing more dancing there. He then goes to the corridor and jumps through a door into a bedroom where a pair of sweethearts are engaged in acts of desire as he keeps dancing and goofing around before flying into a TV. He sings as he flies while shifting positions before making it back to the party room. He then goes to a kitchen and trashes it, turning a table over and knocking the chairs over, before leaping back to the party room again. After that, he leaps to a room where a slumber party is being held as he slides and dances about on the ceiling in the room. Next, he goes back to the party room and phases outside the room, leaping around a corridor and merging at some stairs before going through a door and going back down another corridor back to his apartment, where he collapses back on the bed and falls asleep where he started. The video was published on YouTube in September 2007 and then again in December 2010 as a high-quality file.

Track listings

UK CD1 and Japanese CD single
 "Canned Heat" (7-inch edit) – 3:46
 "Canned Heat" (radio edit) – 3:19
 "Wolf in Sheep's Clothing" – 4:00

UK CD2
 "Canned Heat" (7-inch edit) – 3:46
 "Canned Heat" (album version) – 5:30
 "Deeper Underground" (Chillington mix) – 6:56

UK and US cassette single; US CD and 7-inch single
 "Canned Heat" (7-inch edit) – 3:46
 "Wolf in Sheep's Clothing" – 4:00

European CD single
 "Canned Heat" (7-inch edit) – 3:46
 "Canned Heat" (radio edit) – 3:19

Australian CD single; US maxi-CD and maxi-cassette single
 "Canned Heat" (7-inch edit) – 3:46
 "Canned Heat" (radio edit) – 3:19
 "Wolf in Sheep's Clothing" – 4:00
 "Canned Heat" (album version) – 5:30
 "Deeper Underground" (Chillington mix) – 6:56

US 12-inch single
A. "Canned Heat" – 5:30
B. "Deeper Underground" (Chillington mix) – 6:56

Charts

Weekly charts

Year-end charts

In popular culture

The song is featured in the film Center Stage, released in 2000, in which the dancers perform a piece to this song at the end of the movie.

The song is also featured in Napoleon Dynamite, during the title character's dance performance at the end of a high school assembly.

The song was used in the rhythm based Xbox 360 game Dance Dance Revolution Universe 3; The music video was played in the background as the song would be played.

A cover of the song was featured in a level of the game Elite Beat Agents.

Another cover of the song was featured in the European version of Donkey Konga.

The song was also featured in the PlayStation 3 and Xbox 360 tennis game, Top Spin 3.

A newer cover of the song, entitled "Kashyyyk", appeared in the game Kinect Star Wars and it was entitled "S-Boogie" in the game Boogie.

The song is featured in Lone Survivor, where a rookie jokingly dances in front of a group of unsatisfied Navy SEALS before making a speech to them.

The song was released as downloadable content for the game Rock Band 4.

References

1999 singles
1999 songs
Jamiroquai songs
Music videos directed by Jonas Åkerlund
Nu-disco songs
Songs about dancing
Songs about music
Songs written by Jason Kay
Songs written by Simon Katz
Songs written by Toby Smith
S2 Records singles